Loïc Ritière (born 25 July 2001) is a Belgian professional footballer who plays as a leftback for Mandel United.

Playing career
Ritière made his professional debut with Kortrijk in a 1–0 Belgian First Division A win over Waasland-Beveren on 9 August 2020.

On 9 August 2021, he signed a one-year contract with Mandel United in the third-tier Belgian National Division 1.

References

External links
 

2001 births
Living people
Belgian footballers
Association football fullbacks
K.V. Kortrijk players
Royal FC Mandel United players
Belgian Pro League players
People from Ath
Footballers from Hainaut (province)